Bunt, also spelled 'Bant' in former English usage, is an Indian community.

Academia 
H. S. Ballal, Pro-Chancellor Manipal University and philanthropist

Film and culture 

 Shilpa Shetty, Indian actress
 Aishwarya Rai, Bollywood actress
 Suniel Shetty, Bollywood actor
Athiya Shetty
 Pooja Hegde, Tollywood actress
 Anushka Shetty, Tollywood actress
 Srinidhi Shetty, Sandalwood actress
 Rakshit Shetty, Sandalwood actor
 Dayanand Shetty, Indian TV actor
Roopesh Shetty, Tulu cinema actor
Krithi Shetty, Tollywood actress
Rishab Shetty, Kannada Cinema
Raj B.Shetty, Kannada Cinema
Aishani Shetty, Sandalwood actress
Shamita Shetty, Indian actress
M.B Shetty, Indian Action and Stunt Choreographer
Rohit Shetty, Indian Film Director
Avanthika Shetty, Sandalwood actress
Pramod Shetty, Kannada Cinema
Yagna Shetty, Kannada Cinema
Gurukiran, Singer
Bhoomi Shetty, Sandalwood actress
Krithesh Bhandary
Shreyas Rai
Karthik S Rai
Vivek Shetty Oddambettu
Bharath Kumar Rai

Art 
Sudarshan Shetty, sculptor
Kayyara Kinhanna Rai Author

Business 
A. B. Shetty (1883–1960), founder of Vijaya Bank
B. R. Shetty, CMD New Medical Centre, billionaire and Padma Shri awardee
R. N. Shetty, CMD RNS Infrastructure and hereditary administrator of Murudeshwara Shiva Temple
Muthappa Rai - Indian businessman, former mafia don

Law 
N. Santosh Hegde, judge of the Supreme Court of India and Lokayuktha (ombudsman) of Karnataka state

Medicine 
Devi Shetty, renowned cardiac surgeon
Shantharam Shetty, orthopaedic surgeon

Scientists 
Belle Monappa Hegde, physician, author, educationist and Padma Bhushan awardee
Kullal Chickappu Naik, authority on horticulture, first vice-chairman of University of Agricultural Sciences, Bangalore

References

Bunts
Bunt (community)